Bangladesh Institute of Tropical and Infectious Diseases is a government medical postgraduate institute and Hospital situated at Faujdarhat in Chittagong. It was established in 2013. There is an adjacent 20 bed Infectious Disease Hospital.

History 
Bangladesh government  established this postgraduate institute and Hospital in 2013 to treat tropical diseases in Bangladesh. Prime Minister Sheikh Hasina inaugurated the institution.

References

Health sciences schools in Bangladesh
2013 establishments in Bangladesh
Organisations based in Chittagong
Hospitals in Bangladesh